510 Fifth Avenue, originally the Manufacturers Trust Company Building, is a commercial building at the southwest corner of West 43rd Street and Fifth Avenue in Midtown Manhattan, New York City. Opened in 1954, it is the first bank building in the United States to be built in the International Style. Charles Evans Hughes III and Gordon Bunshaft of Skidmore, Owings & Merrill (SOM) designed the building, along with Roy O. Allen and project manager Patricia W. Swan. The interior was designed by Eleanor H. Le Maire, while Harry Bertoia was hired as an artist for some of the building's artwork. 510 Fifth Avenue was built as a bank for the Manufacturers Trust Company, whose president Horace C. Flanigan wanted the design to be inviting to customers.

510 Fifth Avenue contains four full stories, a penthouse, and a basement. Its facade is made largely of glass walls between mullions made of aluminum. Inside is a circular stainless steel door protecting the original bank vault, which was designed by Henry Dreyfuss. The second story is recessed from the facade, and the floor slabs of the upper stories are carried on four columns, giving the impression that they are floating. The building's height and design was influenced by a lease restriction that prohibited the construction of a taller building on a portion of the site. A smaller penthouse rises above the fourth story.

510 Fifth Avenue was commissioned by Manufacturers Trust in 1944; the original plan was designed by Walker & Gillette and canceled in 1948. Walker & Poor was hired in 1950 to modify the original proposal but were replaced with consulting architect SOM after Bunshaft convinced bank executives that a complete redesign would be cheaper. The building was instantly popular upon its opening, becoming Manufacturers Trust's busiest branch and a tourist attraction in itself. Manufacturers Trust's successor, Chase Bank, sold the building to Tahl-Propp Equities in 2000, and it was purchased by Vornado Realty Trust in 2010. After the Chase branch closed in late 2010, SOM renovated 510 Fifth Avenue and converted it into a commercial structure in 2012.

510 Fifth Avenue's design received critical acclaim upon its completion. Praise was focused particularly on its lightweight facade, ceiling lighting, and visible vault. The design inspired that of other bank buildings erected in the 1950s and 1960s. The building's facade was designated as an official landmark by the New York City Landmarks Preservation Commission (LPC) in 1997, and its interior was similarly designated in 2011, following controversy over the removal of one of Bertoia's artworks.

Site 

510 Fifth Avenue occupies the southwestern corner of Fifth Avenue and 43rd Street in the Midtown Manhattan neighborhood of New York City. The plot is rectangular, measuring  along Fifth Avenue and  along West 43rd Street. 500 Fifth Avenue is immediately to the south and the Salmon Tower Building is to the west. The New York Public Library Main Branch and Bryant Park are one block south on 42nd Street.

The site was previously occupied by two structures: the Ziegler Building and a rowhouse at 508 Fifth Avenue. The Ziegler Building, an eight-story edifice, was built in 1900 upon the lots at 510–514 Fifth Avenue, at the southwest corner of 43rd Street. It contained accountants', brokers', and lawyers' offices, and also had the offices of tobacconist Alfred Dunhill. 508 Fifth Avenue, originally a rowhouse, became a commercial structure in the early 20th century, housing tenants such as the Gotham Silk Hosiery Company and the candy store Huyler's.

Architecture
510 Fifth Avenue was built in the International Style as a bank for the Manufacturers Trust Company. It was designed by Charles Evans Hughes III and Gordon Bunshaft of Skidmore, Owings & Merrill (SOM). While Hughes had won a design competition held within SOM, senior architect Bunshaft and project coordinator William S. Brown were given responsibility for the project, and Hughes's involvement beyond the design competition is unclear. Patricia W. Swan led the design team in collaboration with Bunshaft and Roy O. Allen. Eleanor H. Le Maire was the interior designer, and artist Harry Bertoia was hired to create art for the interior. The George A. Fuller Company erected the structure, with Alan Labie as the job captain. Other firms involved in the building's construction included structural engineers Weiskopf and Pickworth; mechanical and electrical engineers Syska and Hennessy; and landscape architects Clarke and Rapuano.

510 Fifth Avenue is the first International Style bank building in the United States. While earlier bank branches across the U.S. had been designed with similar modern features, they otherwise retained more traditional designs. According to Horace C. Flanigan, the CEO of Manufacturers Trust when the building was constructed, the design was intended to convey a "sense of stability and security" while using modern materials. A press release, issued when the branch opened in 1954, said that the design would advertise itself; Bunshaft likewise compared the high-capacity layout to that of a store. At the time of the building's construction, banks focused on marketing their services, where previously they had focused on security. 510 Fifth Avenue was accordingly described by the Architectural Forum as an example of "a dynamic new kind of prestige design for large financial institutions", through the "lavishness" of its architecture.

Form 
510 Fifth Avenue is five stories tall, with four stories occupying the entire lot, as well as a penthouse recessed from all sides except the western side. The penthouse is "T"-shaped, with a mechanical section on its western side, and a narrower office section extending east. Because 510 Fifth Avenue is surrounded by several skyscrapers, it is only lit by natural light for a short period every day. 

The building's height was affected by an agreement wherein Manufacturers Trust had subleased the lot at 508 Fifth Avenue from Walter J. Salmon Sr., the developer of the 58-story skyscraper at 500 Fifth Avenue to the south. By leasing 508 Fifth Avenue, and thus taking its air rights, Salmon had obtained a taller height for his skyscraper than would be normally allowed under zoning codes. The penthouse is thus set back from the lot line at 508 Fifth Avenue because it rises above the maximum height permitted in the sublease agreement.

Facade 

510 Fifth Avenue contains a facade with a curtain wall made largely of glass, as well as a large bank vault door at ground level, visible from the street. The elevations along Fifth Avenue and 43rd Street are made predominantly of glass. Upon the building's opening, it was estimated to use  of glass in its walls. The panes on the first, third, and fourth floors measure  each. All the glass was made by the Franklin Glass Company, based in Pennsylvania. According to architecture critic Lewis Mumford, the objections to using an all-glass facade were alleviated by the fact that the site was mostly surrounded by skyscrapers. The building thus did not need colored glass walls to absorb heat from sunlight. so its walls were more transparent. The glass walls were given a thin layer of gold tint to reduce glare.

The glass panels are held in place with horizontal rails and vertical mullions made of aluminum. There are dark wire-glass spandrels above each window on the second, third, and fourth floors. The light metal mullions and bars were intended to make the building seem extremely lightweight. The skeletal joints were not covered by moldings and were accordingly built to extremely precise specifications.

Polished black granite strips are used at the building's pedestal, as well as on the western portion of the 43rd Street elevation and the southern portion of the Fifth Avenue elevation. The granite slab at 43rd Street contains inscriptions with the names of SOM and the Fuller Company. The western section of the penthouse is clad with gray brick, while the eastern section is clad with glass. The penthouse is concealed from street level by a recessed parapet made of aluminum and glass.

Two entrances were provided in the original design: the main banking entrance on the eastern side of the 43rd Street facade and the office entrance on the western side of the same facade. The banking entrance was not marked because SOM intended the vault's presence to be self-explanatory. The former banking entrance, later converted into an entrance to the storefront space inside, is three bays wide. As part of a building renovation in the 2010s, two additional entrances were built on Fifth Avenue.

Interior 
510 Fifth Avenue contains either  of floor area. Two elevators and two fire stairs abut the western side of the building. The elevator lobby on the first floor, accessed by the western entrance along 43rd Street, was designed with ceiling tiles made of glass. As designed, the first and second floors were the main banking spaces and are connected by a pair of escalators. When the building was renovated in the 2010s, the first and second floors were reconfigured to accommodate retail space. The upper three floors were used as office space, and when 510 Fifth Avenue was used as a bank, Manufacturers Trust had its clerical offices and the department of personal loans on the third floor. The basement had an employees' lounge.

510 Fifth Avenue is supported by eight interior columns, set back  behind Fifth Avenue and  behind 43rd Street. These piers are clad with white Vermont marble. The concrete floor slabs are cantilevered from the columns. The floor slabs are carried to the 43rd Street facade on steel beams and to the Fifth Avenue facade on concrete beams. The third and fourth-floor slabs are hidden from the outside by the spandrels. The second-floor slab is recessed from the facade and is not hidden by spandrels, giving the appearance it was floating. The building's floors contained asphalt tile and cement finishes above the concrete slabs.

Each story contains vinyl dropped ceilings, suspended from the floor slabs above and divided by metal strips into a grid. Artificial illumination is provided by cathode-ray tubes above the ceiling panels. The panels served to diffuse the light so the tubes could not be seen from below, thereby giving the impression that the ceiling was illuminated from a single light source. The dropped ceiling also conceals mechanical and electrical systems. The air conditioning ducts and other utilities are hidden beneath the south wall and above the ceiling panels. The ceilings also minimized the amount of light that was reflected off the large windows, thus reducing glare.

First floor 

When it was used as a bank, the first floor contained tellers' booths, the vault, and other quick-service banking facilities. The space was relatively plain with individual writing desks as well as an ebony-wood banking counter with a marble countertop. The counter extended in an "L" shape parallel to the southern and western walls. A black granite wall at the southern end of the space separated the banking counter from the vault. The western wall was colored "sky blue", while rectangular flower boxes were arranged next to the eastern wall facing Fifth Avenue. On the western side of the building, separated from the rest of the first floor, is the elevator lobby, accessed from the western entrance on 43rd Street. This space contains steel elevator doors within a dark marble wall.

There was also a steel grille behind the vault opening, which was shut during the daytime. The door, doubling as an advertisement for the bank building, was lit at night and cleaned by an employee every week. While the visibility of the vault door served as a deterrent to thieves, the architects said the vault door's location was a purely aesthetic choice. The bank's CEO at the time, Horace C. Flanigan, stated that the vault was placed on the first floor for convenience. The vault itself measured , with 6,000 safe deposit boxes, and had another door further inside the building. The vault was anchored to the Manhattan bedrock by its own foundations. The front portion of the vault was emptied by the late 1970s, while the rear portion remained in use. The load-bearing vault walls were removed in the 2010s, but the vault door remained in place.

Two escalators lead to the second floor. The original escalators were parallel to the Fifth Avenue facade and were designed as freestanding diagonal structures, giving the appearance that they had no supports of their own. On the sides of the escalators, Le Maire designed aluminum panels with straw-gold finishes; cathode lights shone from behind the panels and were dispersed through tiny openings in each panel. By the early 1990s, the escalator panels had been replaced with silver-colored ones. Bertoia also created an unnamed "wire cloud" artwork above the escalators. The original escalators were replaced in the 2010s with a new set of escalators perpendicular to the new entrances on Fifth Avenue.

Second floor 

There was originally a gap between the second-story slab and the facade, but a glass-and-aluminum partition was installed in the gap by 1993. When used as a bank, the second floor housed a banking area for regular and commercial accounts, as well as offices for senior officers. The accounts department contained desks in an open plan. A single officer worked behind each desk, highlighting the bank's aim of personalized service. The second floor was similar in layout to the first floor except with senior officers' desks in the center. As designed, the second floor also had a counter made of ebony and marble. An air-return duct was hidden in the second-floor banking counter. A large clock containing metal numerals was originally mounted on the western side of the southern wall, which was otherwise painted white. The western wall is made of black granite. Rectangular flower boxes were placed at the edges of the second floor.

In front of the western wall, Bertoia was commissioned to create a "floating" or sculptural screen of 800 intersecting brass, copper, and nickel panels. The work later served as the backdrop for the retail space. Golden Arbor was removed in 2010, over the protests of preservationists, when JPMorgan Chase closed its branch. It returned two years later, after being cleaned and restored, as part of the settlement under which Chase retained ownership of the piece but agreed to place it on indefinite loan for public display in its original home for as long as 510 Fifth Avenue retained landmark status.

Penthouse and roof 
The penthouse was divided into two sections. The western section of the penthouse had mechanical equipment and the stairs and elevators, while the eastern section had a reception lounge, a kitchen, managers' and presidents' offices, and a directors' room. The directors' room could be converted into a dining room and had an ebony table with a removable section. The roof above the fourth floor also had a roof garden.

History
By the 1940s, the Manufacturers Trust Company had 67 bank branches and was growing rapidly. Manufacturers Trust's branch at 513 Fifth Avenue, across the street from the present building, was the bank's second-busiest behind only its main branch in Manhattan's Financial District and had been overburdened for almost a decade. Manufacturers Trust began negotiating in 1941 with the Mutual Life Insurance Company of New York, which owned both the Ziegler Building and 508 Fifth Avenue. Three years later, Manufacturers Trust leased the Ziegler Building from Mutual Life and subleased 508 Fifth Avenue from Walter Salmon.

Planning and construction

Walker & Gillette plans 

After Manufacturers Trust's leases were arranged, architectural firm Walker & Gillette was hired to design a four-story "Federal Classic" bank branch for Manufacturers Trust on that site, replacing the bank's 513 Fifth Avenue branch. The structure would have had a curved granite facade and would have cost either $850,000 or $1.2 million. By October 1944, Mutual Life agreed to clear the land, and the New York State Banking Department approved Manufacturers Trust's proposed relocation that December.  Work was delayed due to restrictions on steel and other materials during World War II. Additionally, after the Ziegler Building's tenants were given notice that their leases would be canceled upon the end of January 1946, they successfully filed a lawsuit to enjoin their eviction. Walker & Gillette's plan was ultimately canceled in 1948 because of difficulties in evicting the existing tenants and clearing the land.

Walker & Gillette's successor firm Walker & Poor was hired in July 1950 to modify the original proposal. Early the next year, in January 1951, Mutual Life had evicted the tenants of 508 Avenue and the Ziegler Building, giving both properties to Manufacturers Trust. However, work was held up again because the federal government had imposed restrictions on steel and other materials for the Korean War. To prevent the Ziegler Building from becoming an unused "white elephant", Manufacturers Trust rented out the Ziegler Building to federal agencies. They rented the space until July 1952, when the wartime restrictions were lifted, and Manufacturers Trust notified these agencies that the building would be razed. By that time, Walker & Pool were no longer employed as the architects of the new bank building.

SOM involvement 
SOM was hired to devise new plans for the Manufacturers Trust branch; two theories are given as to how the firm became involved with the project. Gordon Bunshaft told architecture writer Carol Herselle Krinsky that Manufacturers Trust consulted SOM upon the suggestion of Lou Crandall, a member of Manufacturers Trust's board of directors and the head of the company that built SOM's Lever House. SOM may have also gotten the commission through one of its principals, Louis Skidmore, who was on the board of directors for another Manufacturers Trust branch, and who was friends with Flanigan, the bank's CEO. In either case, SOM was initially invited to look at Walker & Pool's plans and suggest improvements to the design. Krinsky quotes Bunshaft as having called Crandall one hour after first looking at the plans, saying that it would be more worthwhile and cheaper to redesign the building completely.

The agreement between Manufacturers Trust and Mutual Life was changed in 1953 so that Manufacturers Trust, rather than Mutual Life, would be responsible for all construction costs. Furthermore, a skyscraper would require elevator banks that took up much of the first floor on the small site, thus relegating the bank to another floor, which it considered to be undesirable. Manufacturers Trust wanted the building to have an "inviting look", and laid out practical considerations: the building had to accommodate high volumes of customers and it had to be designed so that it could be adapted for other businesses if necessary. Skidmore held an informal competition among SOM's junior architects. Charles Evan Hughes III's winning design featured glass walls and a plainly visible bank vault. Building plans were submitted in April 1953, and the glass facade was installed by July 1954.

Bank use

1960s to 1990s 

Manufacturers Trust invited the media to preview 510 Fifth Avenue on September 22, 1954. On October 2, Manufacturers Trust moved its holdings from 513 Fifth Avenue across the street to its new building. The transfer involved $76 million in deposits (equivalent to $ million in ). The bank building officially opened on October 5, and on its first day received 15,000 visitors.

The opening of 510 Fifth Avenue attracted attention from many media outlets, which praised various aspects of the design, such as the glass facade and the vault's visibility from the street. Within nine months, the bank building had become a tourist attraction in itself, and the branch's deposits had tripled. The New York Times reported that Manufacturers Trust had distributed 1,100 pictures to 146 media outlets. More accounts were opened in the year after 510 Fifth Avenue's opening than at any other Manufacturers Trust branch in any year. During that year, the bank had a 31 percent increase in accounts and a 200 percent increase in profit. In the six years after the branch was completed, it had 100,000 visitors who were not bank patrons, and by 1960, the building had about four hundred such visitors every month. Manufacturers Trust merged with Central Hanover Bank & Trust in 1961 to form the Manufacturers Hanover Corporation. Following the merger, the building remained one of Manufacturers Hanover's busiest branches.

With the closure or downsizing of bank branches in the late 20th century, the New York City Landmarks Preservation Commission (LPC) proposed designating several major bank interiors in 1990, including the Manufacturers Hanover Bank Building, the Greenwich Savings Bank Building, and the Apple Bank for Savings Building. Manufacturers Hanover merged with Chemical Bank in 1991, and Chemical Bank gained ownership of the underlying land from Mutual Life the following February. A sloped partition made of aluminum and glass was installed between the first and second floors in 1993. Various modifications to the building were also undertaken around this time, including the addition of partition walls around the escalators and the addition of a parapet on the second floor. Chemical Bank merged with Chase Bank in 1996 and the combined bank took the Chase brand. The building was undergoing extensive interior alterations by then. The next year, the LPC voted to grant landmark protection to the building's exterior.

2000s 
By 2000, Chase intended to sell 510 Fifth Avenue. At the time, fashion designer Elie Tahari and his eponymous firm had a design studio and sample room at 510 Fifth Avenue. Chase filed a lawsuit against Tahari, alleging that his office was a fire hazard akin to a sweatshop, while a garment workers' union sided with Tahari and alleged that Chase was trying to break the lease to sell the building more profitably. The fire hazard accusations stemmed from a dispute wherein Tahari had allegedly refused to install sprinklers. Tahari was ultimately allowed to stay, and in 2001, Chase sold 510 Fifth Avenue to Tahl-Propp Equities for $24 million. Tahl Propp Equities made Tahari a limited partner as part of the sale.

Vornado Realty Trust indicated its intent to acquire 510 Fifth Avenue in March 2010, and purchased the property that October for $57 million. Chase closed its bank branch in the building shortly afterward. The Bertoia artwork on the second floor was disassembled because Chase's lease agreement at the building required it to take the artwork if it moved away. The removal of the artwork prompted preservationists to start a campaign to grant landmark status to the interior. When the LPC held a hearing on the proposed designation, the Historic Districts Council and Vornado expressed support for such a designation. The LPC designated the mid-century modern interiors of the first and second floors as a landmark in February 2011.

Commercial use

Renovation and controversy 
The Joe Fresh retail chain had signed a lease for part of the space in January 2011. Three months after the lease was signed, and after the interior landmark designation was finalized, Vornado received permission from the LPC to modify the building's interior layout. The project would create two new retail spaces on Fifth Avenue by cutting new doorways into the facade, rotating the escalators away from the windows, and reducing the vault wall. Vornado hired SOM to make the changes. Tenants in the building at the time included Bloomberg L.P., the company of New York City mayor Michael Bloomberg.

Preservationists sued to stop the changes, and a New York Supreme Court judge issued a temporary order blocking the renovation in July 2011, which was subsequently converted into an injunction. These preservationists criticized the renovation as damaging to a significant building and suggested that this was part of a pattern of city government unduly favoring developers, while the building's owner and others argued that the project were consistent with and showed respect for the property. Architecture critic Ada Louise Huxtable of The Wall Street Journal criticized the project as a "travesty" and "conversion to generic commercial space", expressing particular criticism of the removal of the Bertoia screen from the site. 510 Fifth Avenue was added to the World Monuments Fund's 2012 "watch list" of endangered buildings. The organization for Documentation and Conservation of Buildings, Sites and Neighborhoods of the Modern Movement (DOCOMOMO) and a coalition of preservationist organizations brought a lawsuit against Vornado for allegedly removing the historic elements protected under the city landmark designations.

The organizations and Vornado came to a settlement in February 2012. As part of the settlement, the Bertoia works were reinstalled in the renovation. In addition, the interior was restored to resemble their original design, while glass interior partitions separating the retail spaces were installed to "minimize their visual presence". The escalators were replaced, the wall of the former vault was removed, and additional steel framing and reinforced polymer fabric was installed to provide structural support. The facade and interior columns were also restored, and the luminous ceiling was replaced with a replica. The renovation was completed by the end of 2012.

Subsequent tenancy
Joe Fresh occupied  of retail space on the ground floor and second-floor mezzanine for its flagship store, starting in 2012. On the western side of the ground floor, Tahari opened a pop-up store at 510 Fifth Avenue in 2013, and also maintained space in the penthouse. Joe Fresh announced in 2015 that it would close the 510 Fifth Avenue location and sublease the space. The Joe Fresh store closed in March 2016.

Clothing retailer The North Face signed an eight-year sublease from Joe Fresh in 2016. The sublease involved  on the basement, first, and second stories. In 2018, Vornado proposed installing a glass wall around the escalators between the first and second floors. Theodore Grunewald, a preservationist involved in the 2011 lawsuit against Vornado, expressed concern that the glass wall might not conform to the design of the original wall at that location. Amid the COVID-19 pandemic in New York City, Tahari broke his lease at 510 Fifth Avenue in July 2020, prompting Vornado to sue for $14.8 million in future rent payments through the end of Tahari's lease in 2025.

Impact
With the success of 510 Fifth Avenue's design, Manufacturers Trust retrofitted its other branches with similarly modern designs. By the 1960s, many banks across the United States were being built in the International Style. In New York City, such banks included the Emigrant Bank's main location one block south at 5 East 42nd Street, which opened in 1969, and Chase Bank's banking concourse at 28 Liberty Street, which opened in 1964. The vault, in particular, proved to be more secure than traditional bank vaults since thieves were deterred by its placement facing the street. Other banks started using visible vault doors after 510 Fifth Avenue was completed.

Critical reception
510 Fifth Avenue was mostly positively reviewed by architectural critics. Robin Pogrebin of The New York Times wrote that 510 Fifth Avenue was "the very model" of modern architecture, and "an important, historic building in the same league as modern architectural legends like Lever House and the Seagram Building". The AIA Guide to New York City called it "a glass-sheathed supermarket of dollars" and stated that the building "led the banking profession out of the cellar and onto the street."  The Times characterized the building as a "luminous box with an unbroken glass facade", and Lewis Mumford compared it to a lantern, 510 Fifth Avenue's lightweight design was described by its construction superintendent as being "more like jewelry than building". The building's glass design has been called a "metaphor for honesty and transparency in banking" and a "symbol of a self-confident era" which influenced commercial architecture. Interiors magazine wrote that Le Maire's design of the interior "accord with the directness and purity of the architecture".

The Bertoia piece attracted mixed feedback. One review characterized it as "breath-taking", while more critical observers stated that "it looks like a flying bedspring" and "a pile of broken egg crates". David W. Dunlap characterized Bertoia's work as a "midcentury masterwork" and "the three-dimensional equivalent" of a Jackson Pollock painting.

Some reviews of 510 Fifth Avenue were negative. Huxtable criticized the original illumination as being too yellow. Harper's Magazine assailed the building as the most "uneconomical piece of architecture since the pyramids", alluding to the Giza pyramid complex. The criticism in Harper was mainly based on the fact that the building still had a significant amount of air rights remaining from the lots at 510–514 Fifth Avenue.

Landmark designations 
As early as 1979, the LPC considered making 510 Fifth Avenue an official city landmark, but because the building was less than 30 years old, it was not yet eligible for such a designation. The LPC first held hearings to grant landmark status to the building's exterior in 1985 and 1986, but the property was not designated because of opposition at the time from Manufacturers Hanover and Mutual Life. A subsequent set of three hearings were held in 1989 and 1990.

The LPC designated the Manufacturers Trust Company Building's exterior, along with the Ford Foundation Building and the CBS Building, as city landmarks on October 21, 1997. A separate landmark designation was granted to a portion of the Manufacturers Trust Company Building's interior on February 15, 2011.  The interior landmark designation only covered the banking spaces on the first and second floors, and excluded the offices on the third through fifth floors as well as the basement. In designating the interior as a landmark, Commission chairman Robert B. Tierney said that the building's "luminous ceilings, spacious floor plans, white marble piers and other minimalist features blur the distinction between inside and out."

Awards 
The building's original design received the Architectural League of New York's Gold Medal for Architecture in 1955 and the Municipal Art Society's Plaque of Commendation the same year. The Fifth Avenue Association gave the building an Award for Excellence the next year. The 2012 renovation and adaptive reuse received a 2013 American Institute of Architects New York City Chapter Design Award and a 2013 Architectural Record "Good Design is Good Business" award.

See also
 List of New York City Designated Landmarks in Manhattan from 14th to 59th Streets

References
Informational notes

Citations

Bibliography
 
 
 
 
 
 
 
 
 
 <

External links
 
 Review of the 1954 Manufacturer's Hanover Trust Branch Bank in NYC

1954 establishments in New York City
Bank buildings in Manhattan
Commercial buildings completed in 1954
Fifth Avenue
Historic bank buildings in the United States
International style architecture in New York City
JPMorgan Chase buildings
Midtown Manhattan
Modernist architecture in New York City
New York City Designated Landmarks in Manhattan
New York City interior landmarks
Skidmore, Owings & Merrill buildings